The Lyzovka is a river in Perm Krai, Russia, a right tributary of the Kolva, which in turn is a tributary of the Vishera. The Lyzovka flows into the Kolva  from Kolva's mouth.

References 

Rivers of Perm Krai